Dawid Kwiek (born January 22, 1988 in Freiburg) is a Polish-Canadian footballer who currently plays for Widzew Łódź.

Career
Kwiek began his career at Wisła Kraków. In 2007-08 season he won the Młoda Ekstraklasa title with Wisła Kraków (ME) team. In 2009, he moved to Swiss 2. Liga Interregional club Signal FC Bernex-Confignon. On 14 July 2009 he joined Yverdon Sports to play in Swiss Challenge League and left the club after a half year. After one month without a club joined on 24 January 2010 on trial to LKS Nieciecza and signed on 6 February 2010 a contract with the Polish club. In February 2011, he joined Resovia on one and a half contract.

Personal life
Kwiek was born in Freiburg, Germany of Polish descent and then moved with his family to Canada, before returning to Poland, the country of his parents, at 14 years of age.

References

External links
 Dawid Kwiek - Futbol.pl
 
 Dawid Kwiek - Football.ch

1988 births
Living people
Polish footballers
Wisła Kraków players
Bruk-Bet Termalica Nieciecza players
Widzew Łódź players
Ekstraklasa players
Canadian expatriate soccer players
Canadian expatriate sportspeople in Switzerland
Canadian soccer players
Association football forwards
Canadian people of Polish descent
Sportspeople from Freiburg im Breisgau
Expatriate footballers in Switzerland
Footballers from Baden-Württemberg
Polish expatriate sportspeople in Switzerland